The Church of the Holy Trinity is an historic Episcopal church at 381 Main Street in Middletown, Connecticut.  Completed in 1874, it is one of the city's finest examples of Gothic Revival architecture.  Its nearby former rectory, also known as the Bishop Acheson House, is one of its finest Colonial Revival houses.  The two buildings were listed on the National Register of Historic Places in 1979.

Church

Relationship to surroundings
This Gothic church at 381 Main Street faces east from the west side of Main Street on the central block between Court and Washington streets. it is set back from the street with a lawn in front. Its substantial appearance, emphasized by the sombre tones of the heavy brownstone construction, contrasts greatly with the flat facades and brightly decorated storefronts on Main Street.

Significance

The Episcopal Church in Middletown had its beginnings as early as 1724. Unlike many Colonial Anglican churches, it was firmly committed to the patriot cause during the American Revolution. This is the third meeting house of the parish, which was formally established as Christ Church in 1750. Several of its ministers have become bishops, including Abraham Jarvis, John Williams, and Edward Campion Acheson, father of Dean Acheson.

The church was built in 1870-1874. Henry Dudley was the architect and the firm of McConochie, Moor and Mylechreest was the prime contractor. Constructed of local brownstone, this church displays a symmetrically arranged facade with a buttressed bell tower at the southeast corner. A large rose tracery window is the dominant decorative feature of this facade, which also displays arched and lancet windows. The tower lacks a spire but features narrow arched windows which emphasize its verticality, and echo the fenestration of the facades. The interior displays elaborate tracery trusses support on cast iron posts. The present altar and reredos were added around 1892 and were designed by Charles Haight of New York.

In the two decades following the American Civil War, a number of institutional buildings were constructed in the Gothic Revival style in Middletown. The design of this church is representative of that pattern.

Current use and condition
The church continues to be used as a church and is in good condition. The restoration of most of the stained glass windows was completed in 2011. Its current missional curate is the Rev. Mary Russell Barnett and missional priest in charge is the Rev. Mary Anne Osborn.

Rectory

The former rectory at 144 Broad Street, also known as the Bishop Acheson House, is now St. Luke's Housing for the Elderly. It is of the Colonial Revival style and was built in 1902-1903. The builder and architect are not known.

Relationship to surroundings
This large house is set back from the street on a large, well landscaped lot. The street is primarily residential with mid to late 19th century houses. Nearby are two small commercial buildings and the Gothic Revival Russell Library.

Significance
This house, built in 1902, was the third rectory of the Holy Trinity Church. The Reverend Edward Campion Acheson, the eighteenth rector of the church, was the first occupant. His son, Dean Acheson, served as Secretary of State under President Harry S. Truman. Upon the  Reverend Mr. Acheson's resignation from the pulpit in 1915 he became the sixth Bishop of Connecticut. the house no longer serves as a rectory for Holy Trinity Church.  It is now residential apartments for the elderly, known as St. Luke's.

This large house is an excellent example of the Georgian Revival style, with well executed details: six column entrance portico with balustrade; Palladian window; and modillioned cornice.

Current use and condition
The building has been converted into an elderly residential apartments run by St. Luke's. The property is in very good condition.

See also

 Broad Street Historic District (Middletown, Connecticut)
 National Register of Historic Places listings in Middletown, Connecticut

References

Middletown, Connecticut Historical and Architectural Resources. Volume III, Card Number 173. John Reynolds. July, 1978. (church)
Middletown, Connecticut Historical and Architectural Resources. Volume II, Card Number 30. E. Loomis & John Reynolds. March, 1978. (rectory)

External links

 Holy Trinity website

Churches in Middletown, Connecticut
Holy Trinity
Churches on the National Register of Historic Places in Connecticut
National Register of Historic Places in Middlesex County, Connecticut
Historic district contributing properties in Connecticut